Cychropsis deuvei is a species of ground beetle in the subfamily of Carabinae. It was described by Korell & Klienfeld in 1987.

References

deuvei
Beetles described in 1987